Tihomir Đorđević (Knjaževac, Principality of Serbia, 19 February 1868 — Belgrade, Kingdom of Yugoslavia, 28 May 1944) was a Serbian ethnologist, folklorist, cultural historian and professor at the University of Belgrade.

Biography
He received his B.A. in History and Philology at the Grandes écoles in Belgrade. He pursued his post-graduate studies in Vienna and Munich, where he received his doctorate in 1902. Among the Munich alumnae were Miloje Vasić, Veselin Čajkanović and Dragutin Anastasijević, his contemporaries.

Đorđević's interests were very wide and varied, ranging from detailed analyzes of the folklife of Serbs through ethnographic research of the lives of other peoples in Serbia (Romani people, Vlachs, Aromanians, Greeks, Circassians, etc.) to folklore and sociological studies not only of Serbia, but also of the Balkan people in general .

Although not an anthropologist, he is the first Serbian scientist who explicitly pointed to the importance of paleoanthropology for history and ethnology. In 1908, while researching at the unknown cemetery in Žagubica, he demonstrated that old cemeteries, necropolises, are primary sources for data for many scientific disciplines. In his book Đorđević emphasized that the data, obtained through the study of skeletons and graves, represent the only source of material, appearance and way of life of a people in the past when written records are lacking.

He was elected a correspondent member of the Serbian Academy of Sciences and Arts on 19 February 1921, and regular member on 16 February 1937.

Major works

 The Truth Concerning the Romanes in Serbia, Paris, Impremèrie Graphique, 1919
 Macedonia, London, Allen & Unwin, 1918
 From Serbia, Prince Miloš, I-II, 1922–1924
 Gypsies in Serbia, a doctoral dissertation
 Our national life, Volumes I-X

See also
 Sima Trojanović
 Jovan Erdeljanović
 Ljubomir Davidović

References 

1868 births
1944 deaths
People from Knjaževac
Serbian folklorists
University of Belgrade
Members of the Serbian Academy of Sciences and Arts